Line TV is a video-on-demand, over-the-top media service owned by Japan-based Line Corporation. It is a free-to-access, advertisement-supported service, available via mobile applications, digital media players, and the World Wide Web. It carries programming from local television networks, and also partners with studios to produce its own original content.

The service launched in Thailand in 2015, where it became the most popular online video platform for local television content, with over 40 million users. It later expanded to Taiwan, and in 2020 to nineteen other territories, mainly in Southeast Asia, Latin America, and the United States. Line TV was instrumental in popularizing the boys' love genre in Thailand as well as exporting such Thai series to overseas audiences. However, the company retired the service in Thailand at the end of 2021.

In 2020 Line TV partnered with GagaOOLala, a Taipei-based global LGBT streaming and TV production service, to license the latter's content.

See also
Line (software), Line Corporation's better known messaging application
Television in Thailand

References

 
Video on demand services
Mass media in Thailand
Naver Corporation
Z Holdings
Internet television streaming services